Isa Knox may refer to:

Isa Knox (1831–1903) - a Scottish poet of the 19th century.
Ĭsa Knox - a Korean cosmetics company